A Musician and His Daughter is an early 17th century painting by Dutch portraitist Thomas de Keyser. Done in oil on wood panel, the painting depicts a father and his daughter in their contemporaneously stylish home. The painting is currently in the collection of the Metropolitan Museum of Art.

References 

1629 paintings
Paintings in the collection of the Metropolitan Museum of Art